Baxter is an unincorporated community in Drew County, Arkansas, United States. It is located on Arkansas Highway 35 west of Dermott, near where the highway crosses Bayou Bartholomew.  Located  from the bayou mouth, it traditionally marked the head of navigation on the bayou.

The Baxter Vidette,  an African-American newspaper, began publishing in Baxter in 1902.

References

Unincorporated communities in Drew County, Arkansas
Unincorporated communities in Arkansas